Horace Victor Eugene Redfield (1845 - 1881) was a journalist with the Cincinnati Commercial and an author of a book comparing violence in the northern and southern United States. He was born in Eden, New York. When he was four his father died.

He was born in Erie County, New York. His father died while he was young, and he moved with his mother to Jasper, Tennessee in 1860.

Pennsylvania State University has a collection of his papers.

Book
Homicide North and South (1880)

Personal life
He married Jennette Hamlin, daughter of Byron D. Hamlin, in 1896.

References

1845 births
1881 deaths
Place of death missing
Date of birth missing
Date of death missing
People from Eden, New York
Journalists from Ohio
People from Jasper, Tennessee
Writers from Cincinnati
19th-century American journalists
19th-century American male writers
American male writers
Journalists from New York (state)
Journalists from Tennessee